Bohr's law may refer to:

 Bohr model
 Bohr effect
 Bohr equation
 Gunslinger effect